Nathan Kenneth Patterson (born 16 October 2001) is a Scottish professional footballer who plays as a right-back for Premier League club Everton and the Scotland national team.

Club career

Rangers
A Rangers youth graduate who attended Holyrood Secondary School in southern Glasgow as a participant in the Scottish Football Association's 'Performance Schools' development programme, Patterson signed a new contract on 21 December 2019, keeping him at the club until 2022. He made his debut on 17 January 2020, in a Scottish Cup match against Stranraer at Ibrox Stadium. He made his league debut against Kilmarnock on 22 August 2020, coming on as a substitute in the 86th minute in a 2–0 win.

Patterson made his European debut on 10 December 2020, starting in a 2–0 away win against Polish side Lech Poznań. He scored his first goal for the club on 25 February 2021, in a UEFA Europa League match against Royal Antwerp, scoring 16.6 seconds after coming on as a second half substitute. Patterson played regularly for Rangers during the later part of their 2020–21 title-winning season, deputising for the injured James Tavernier, until he was suspended for breaching coronavirus pandemic rules.

Everton
On 4 January 2022, Patterson signed for Everton on a five-and-a-half-year deal. The transfer fee was officially undisclosed, though it was reported that Everton paid Rangers an initial £12 million, with further payments that could potentially take the total value to £16 million. Having been signed by manager Rafa Benitez who was soon sacked, Patterson's Everton career got off to a slow start, initially playing for the under-23s rather than the first team. This trend continued for the entirety of the 2021/2022 Premier League season, with Patterson making no first team appearances in the Premier League despite the club's continued high hopes for the player. These limited opportunities for Patterson were, until April, due to the team wanting to give Patterson the time to adjust to the pace and freneticism of the Premier League before handing him a full debut. However, Patterson was unable to play after from April 10 onwards due to an ankle injury sustained in Everton's final training session before playing West Ham on April 3. This ankle injury required surgery and ruled Patterson out for the remainder of the season.

Patterson was named to start in all of Everton's four pre-season games before the commencement of the 2022/23 season. Throughout pre-season, he managed a total of two assists, both coming in the match against Blackpool (Vitaliy Mykolenko's 6th minute goal and Dele Alli's 64th minute goal). Patterson's positive performances in pre-season earned him the plaudits of both his manager and former footballers alike.

International career
Patterson has represented Scotland at various youth levels up to under-21s. He was added to the full national squad for the first time in May 2021, ahead of the delayed UEFA Euro 2020 tournament. Patterson made his full international debut in a pre-tournament friendly against Luxembourg, came off the bench during the Euros against Croatia at Hampden Park, and made his first start against Moldova in September of that year during 2022 FIFA World Cup qualification. On 12 November 2021, Patterson scored a first international goal when he opened the scoring in a vital 2–0 win away in Moldova before setting up Ché Adams for the second. This victory saw Scotland qualify for a World Cup play-off place.

Personal life
In February 2021, Patterson was one of five Rangers players fined by Scottish police "for attending an illegal gathering of 10 people in a flat" in breach of lockdown rules during the coronavirus pandemic. Patterson and the other players were banned for six games by the SFA for the breach, although part of that sentence was suspended.

Career statistics

Club

International

Scores and results list Scotland's goal tally first, score column indicates score after each Patterson goal.

Honours
Rangers
Scottish Premiership: 2020–21

Notes

References

External links
 Profile at the Everton F.C. website

2001 births
Living people
Footballers from Glasgow
Scottish footballers
Association football defenders
Rangers F.C. players
Everton F.C. players
Scottish Professional Football League players
Premier League players
Scotland youth international footballers
Scotland under-21 international footballers
Scotland international footballers
UEFA Euro 2020 players
People educated at Holyrood Secondary School